"Say What You Want" is a song by Canadian rock band Barenaked Ladies. It is the lead single from their 2015 album, Silverball. It was made available for streaming by Entertainment Weekly on April 27, 2015, then for digital download the following day.

History
Barenaked Ladies frontman, Ed Robertson was quoted as saying "Say What You Want is a celebration of letting go. It’s about feeling confident, and realizing that you can’t control what other people do or say, you can only control how you react to it. It’s a very triumphant song for me."

Release

References

Barenaked Ladies songs
Songs written by Ed Robertson
Song recordings produced by Gavin Brown (musician)
2015 singles
2015 songs
Vanguard Records singles